Tomáš Bureš (born 27 September 1978, in Prostějov) is a Czech former football goalkeeper.

Career

Bureš started his career with LeRK Prostějov.

References

 
 Guardian Football

1978 births
Living people
Sportspeople from Prostějov
Czech footballers
Association football goalkeepers
Czech First League players
SK Sigma Olomouc players
FK Drnovice players
FC Zbrojovka Brno players
1. SK Prostějov players